Butch Thompson (born December 15, 1970) is an American baseball coach and former pitcher, who is the current head baseball coach of the Auburn Tigers.  He was named to that position prior to the 2016 NCAA Division I baseball season. He has led Auburn to the College World Series in 2019 and 2022. In 2014, he was named the ABCA/Baseball America Assistant Coach of the Year.

Playing career
Thompson played two seasons at Itawamba Community College before his final two years of eligibility at Birmingham–Southern.

Head coaching record

See also
List of current NCAA Division I baseball coaches

References

Living people
Baseball pitchers
Auburn Tigers baseball coaches
Birmingham–Southern Panthers baseball coaches
Birmingham–Southern Panthers baseball players
Georgia Bulldogs baseball coaches
Huntingdon Hawks baseball coaches
Itawamba Indians baseball players
Mississippi State Bulldogs baseball coaches
Amory High School alumni
People from Amory, Mississippi
1970 births
Baseball coaches from Mississippi
University of Alabama at Birmingham alumni